True Carnage is the fourth album by American death metal band Six Feet Under. The album contains fan favourites such as "The Day the Dead Walked", "One Bullet Left" and "Sick and Twisted".

It is the band's first album to feature their modern logo on the cover, as well as their shortest album to date.

Track listing

Personnel
Six Feet Under
Chris Barnes - vocals
Steve Swanson - guitars
Terry Butler - bass
Greg Gall - drums

Guest musicians
Ice-T - guest vocals on "One Bullet Left"
Karyn Crisis - guest vocals on "Sick and Twisted"

Production
Produced by Brian Slagel
Engineered by Chris Carroll, Kieran Wagner, Marc Lee and Dave Hyman
Engineered drums by Donald Tardy
Recorded and mixed by Dave Schiffman at The Hit Factory Criteria Miami
Mastered by Eddy Schreyer at Oasis Mastering
Artwork
Cover art and layout by Paul Booth

2001 albums
Six Feet Under (band) albums
Metal Blade Records albums